The 1979 Cornell Big Red football team was an American football team that represented Cornell University during the 1979 NCAA Division I-A football season. Cornell tied for fourth in the Ivy League. 

In its third season under head coach Bob Blackman, the team compiled a 5–4 record and outscored opponents 215 to 152. Brad Decker and Jim DeStefano were the team captains. 

Cornell's 4–3 conference record tied for fourth place in the Ivy League standings. The Big Red outscored Ivy opponents 179 to 121. 

Cornell played its home games at Schoellkopf Field in Ithaca, New York.

Schedule

References

Cornell
Cornell Big Red football seasons
Cornell Big Red football